The Todd Historic District is a  national historic district located at Todd, Ashe County, North Carolina.  It encompasses 24 contributing buildings and one other contributing site in the rural community of Todd. It includes commercial and residential structures, a church, and a hotel. Located in the district is the Todd General Store.

It was listed on the National Register of Historic Places in 2000.

References

Historic districts on the National Register of Historic Places in North Carolina
Geography of Ashe County, North Carolina
National Register of Historic Places in Ashe County, North Carolina